The 2022 Challenger Biel/Bienne was a professional tennis tournament played on indoor hard courts. It was the second edition of the tournament which was part of the 2022 ATP Challenger Tour. It took place in Biel/Bienne, Switzerland between 21 and 27 March 2022.

Singles main-draw entrants

Seeds

 1 Rankings are as of 14 March 2022.

Other entrants
The following players received wildcards into the singles main draw:
  Kilian Feldbausch
  Jérôme Kym
  Leandro Riedi

The following players received entry into the singles main draw using protected rankings:
  Li Zhe
  Go Soeda

The following players received entry from the qualifying draw:
  Gijs Brouwer
  Marek Gengel
  Aleksandar Kovacevic
  Georgii Kravchenko
  Jelle Sels
  Otto Virtanen

The following players received entry as lucky losers:
  Adrián Menéndez Maceiras
  Aldin Šetkić

Champions

Singles

  Jurij Rodionov def.  Kacper Żuk 7–6(7–3), 6–4.

Doubles

  Pierre-Hugues Herbert /  Albano Olivetti def.  Purav Raja /  Ramkumar Ramanathan 6–3, 6–4.

References

2022 ATP Challenger Tour
March 2022 sports events in Switzerland